Preston Plucknett is a suburb of Yeovil in Somerset, England.  It was once a small village, and a separate civil parish until 1930, when it was absorbed into the neighbouring parishes of Yeovil, Brympton and West Coker.  It was listed in the Domesday Book of 1086 as "Preston" (Old English: preost tun, "priest farm/settlement") when its lord was Ansger of Montacute (Alfward before 1066). In the 13th century, Alan de Plugenet was lord of the manor and added his surname to Preston.  Following the 20th century expansion of Yeovil, Preston Plucknett became little more than a suburb of the town.  Throughout the centuries the spelling and pronunciation of the name has changed and evolved until it became the present day "Preston Plucknett." The parish of Preston Plucknett was part of the Stone Hundred.

The village church, dedicated to St James, dates from 1420, and has a  20 m (60 ft) tower with six bells.  The church was restored and partially rebuilt during the 1860s.  A vestry was added in the 1950s and an annexe in 1979, which was expanded in 2001. It became a separate parish church in 1988: until that time, it had been a church of St John’s, the parish church of Yeovil. It has a daughter church, St Peter's, built in the 1930s.

The tithe barn at Preston Plucknett was included in the fifth list of ancient monuments prepared by the Commissioner of Works in 1925. The Abbey Barn and associated Abbey Farm House are both Grade I listed buildings.

The still preserved manor house of Preston Plucknett was built in the early 15th century, around 1420, by John Stourton (d. 1438; cousin of his namesake John Stourton, 1st Baron Stourton), a justice of the peace, sheriff, and several times Member of Parliament for Somerset, who, helped by three good marriages, accumulated a respectable wealth. The manor was left to his third and surviving spouse, Katherine Payne, and eventually inherited by his three daughters, one of which, Alice, was married to Sir William Daubeney and was the mother of Giles Daubeney, 1st Baron Daubeney.

The village is included in The Meaning of Liff defined as "a very large string bag made of thin strong cord into which feathers from freshly killed ducks and chickens were stuffed, from Preston in Lancashire".

References

S. J. Gunn, "Daubeney, Giles, first Baron Daubeney (1451/2–1508)", Oxford Dictionary of National Biography, Oxford University Press, 2004 accessed 4 Dec 2005
G. L. Harriss, "Stourton family (per. c. 1380–1485)", Oxford Dictionary of National Biography, Oxford University Press, 2004; online edn, May 2005 accessed 4 Dec 2005

External links

The history of St James' Church, Preston Plucknett, Yeovil (from the church's website)
Records pertaining to Preston Pluckett in collections in the British National Archives.
St Peters Church, Preston Plucknett, Yeovil (from the church's website)

Further reading
Sir Robert de Z. Hall, "Post-Medieval Land Tenure, Preston Plucknett", Proceedings of the Somerset Archaeological and Natural History Society, CV (1961), pp. 110–132.

Villages in South Somerset
Yeovil
Former civil parishes in Somerset